Elizabeth C. Long (born 30 July 1946) is a British former swimmer. She competed in three events at the 1964 Summer Olympics.

She represented England and won two bronze medals in 440 yards individual freestyle and 440 yards freestyle relay, at the 1962 British Empire and Commonwealth Games in Perth, Western Australia. Four years later she participated in the 440 yards individual freestyle at the 1966 British Empire and Commonwealth Games in Kingston, Jamaica.

She also won the 1964 and 1965 ASA National Championship 220 yards freestyle title and is a four times winner of the 440 yards freestyle title (1960 and 1962-1965).

References

1946 births
Living people
British female swimmers
Olympic swimmers of Great Britain
Swimmers at the 1964 Summer Olympics
People from Ilford
Sportspeople from London
Commonwealth Games medallists in swimming
Commonwealth Games bronze medallists for England
Swimmers at the 1962 British Empire and Commonwealth Games
Swimmers at the 1966 British Empire and Commonwealth Games
20th-century British women
Medallists at the 1962 British Empire and Commonwealth Games